Matawai can refer to:
Matawai people, an ethnic group of Suriname
Matawai language, the language of Suriname's Matawai people
Matawai, New Zealand, a settlement in New Zealand's North Island

Language and nationality disambiguation pages